Clinton is a home rule-class city and the county seat of Hickman County, Kentucky, United States. The population was 1,388 at the 2010 census, a decline from 1,415 in 2000.

History
Clinton appears to have been named after a riverboat or military captain who was stationed at the location around the time it was settled in the late 1820s. Clinton was incorporated in 1831.

It was the home to Clinton College from 1871 to 1915.

Geography
Clinton is located in central Hickman County at  (36.667040, -88.994103). U.S. Route 51 passes through the center of town as Washington Street, leading north  to Cairo, Illinois, and south  to Fulton on the Tennessee border.

Demographics

At the 2000 census there were 1,415 people in 579 households, including 354 families, in the city. The racial makeup of the city was 70.46% White, 27.14% African American, 0.49% Native American, and 1.91% from two or more races. Hispanic or Latino of any race were 1.55%.

Of the 579 households 28.5% had children under the age of 18 living with them, 38.9% were married couples living together, 19.5% had a female householder with no husband present, and 38.7% were non-families. 36.1% of households were one person and 17.4% were one person aged 65 or older. The average household size was 2.18 and the average family size was 2.82.

The age distribution was 22.8% under the age of 18, 5.8% from 18 to 24, 24.6% from 25 to 44, 21.8% from 45 to 64, and 24.9% 65 or older. The median age was 42 years. For every 100 females, there were 72.6 males. For every 100 females age 18 and over, there were 66.0 males.

The median household income was $21,875 and the median family income  was $27,847. Males had a median income of $29,375 versus $16,786 for females. The per capita income for the city was $15,236. About 26.8% of families and 31.6% of the population were below the poverty line, including 51.3% of those under age 18 and 21.4% of those age 65 or over.

Education
Clinton  has a lending library, the Hickman County Memorial Library.

References

External links
 City of Clinton 

Cities in Hickman County, Kentucky
County seats in Kentucky
Cities in Kentucky